Frisian rebellion may refer to the following:

The East Frisian rebellion against the rule of the tom Brok family over East Frisia which began with the Battle of Detern in 1426
An uprising in Friesland province from 1515 to 1523 that was staged by the Arumer Zwarte Hoop

Wars involving Frisia
Rebellion
History of Friesland